Remshalden is a municipality in the Rems-Murr district, in Baden-Württemberg, Germany. It is located on the river Rems, 8 km east of Waiblingen, and 18 km east of Stuttgart.

Twin towns
The twin towns of Remshalden are:
 Gournay-en-Bray, France, since 1989
  Etyek, Hungary, since 1994
  Elterlein, Germany

People 
 Ernst Heinkel (1888-1958), German engineer

References

External links

Remshalden website 

Rems-Murr-Kreis
Württemberg